This is a list of properties and districts in Cherokee County, Georgia that are listed on the National Register of Historic Places (NRHP).

Current listings

|}

References

Cherokee
Buildings and structures in Cherokee County, Georgia